The Boulder Dushanbe Tea House was a gift from Mayor Maksud Ikramov of Dushanbe to the city of Boulder, Colorado.

History

The Boulder Dushanbe Teahouse was created as a gift to the city of Boulder, Colorado, from its sister city Dushanbe, the capital of the Tajik Soviet Socialist Republic, then part of the Soviet Union and now Tajikistan, in 1987. Forty Tajik artisans hand-made the teahouse over a period of two years, took it apart, and then packed the pieces into about 200 crates to be shipped to Boulder. The trades used by the artisans were passed from generation to generation within families, such as the use of nature, and repetition of patterns, descendant from traditional Persian design. Also, no power tools were used in the original construction of the tea house.

Lack of funds meant that it took several years to erect the teahouse. Many dedicated individuals including former Boulder mayor Linda Jourgensen, longtime city council member Sally Martin, Boulder-Dushanbe Sister Cities members Mary Axe, Jancy Campbell, noted local architect Vern Seieroe and many others kept the project alive by continuously promoting the unique gift in the community year in and year out.

Decoration

It is situated along a brook that shoots off Boulder Creek in keeping with the tradition that teahouses be placed along waterways or other bodies of water. Reflecting another traditional aspect of Tajik culture, the Boulder Valley Rose Society donated and planted an elaborate rose garden on the teahouse grounds. Inside the teahouse there are uniquely designed hand-carved cedar pillars, handmade traditional Tajikistan furniture, a fountain with seven bronze statues of women based on a 12th-century poem, "The Seven Beauties," original oil paintings done onsite by a Tajik artist, and traditional geometric plaster carvings. The outside decorative elements include eight ceramic tiles, which display the patterns of a "Tree of life."

The current operator is Lenny Martinelli. The building and grounds are property of the City of Boulder.

References
cute

External links
Colorado Spaces
Boulder's Dushanbe Teahouse Website

Culture of Boulder, Colorado
Tea houses
Tajikistani culture
Tourist attractions in Boulder, Colorado
Buildings and structures in Boulder, Colorado